Acoustic communication means communication by means of sound, such as:

Underwater acoustic communication
Acoustic communication in aquatic animals
Acoustic communication in fish
Auditory animal communication
Human speech
Bird vocalization

Acoustics